The 2016–17 Saudi Crown Prince Cup was the 42nd season of the Saudi Crown Prince Cup since its establishment in 1957. This season's competition featured a total of 30 teams, 14 teams from the Pro League, and 16 teams from the First Division. It started with the Preliminary stage on 15 August 2016 and concluded with the final on 10 March 2017.

The holders were Al-Hilal who beat Al-Ahli 2–1 in the previous season's final on 19 February 2016. They were eliminated in the semi-finals by Al-Nassr.

Al-Ittihad won their 8th title following a 1–0 win over Al-Nassr in the final.

Participating teams
Pro League (14 Teams)

First Division (16 Teams)

First stage

Preliminary round
The Preliminary round fixtures were played on 15, 16, 25, 26, 27 & 28 August 2016. All times are local, AST (UTC+3).

Second stage

Bracket

Note:     H: Home team,   A: Away team

Round of 16
The Round of 16 fixtures were played on 26, 27, 28 & 29 September 2016. All times are local, AST (UTC+3).

Quarter-finals
The quarter-finals fixtures were played on 24 & 25 October 2016. All times are local, AST (UTC+3).

Semi-finals
The semi-finals fixtures were played on 26 & 27 December 2016. All times are local, AST (UTC+3).

Final

The final was held on 10 March 2017 in the King Fahd International Stadium in Riyadh. All times are local, AST (UTC+3).

Top goalscorers
As of 10 March 2017

References

Saudi Crown Prince Cup seasons
2016–17 domestic association football cups
Crown Prince Cup